Chatham-Kent—Essex (formerly known as Kent—Essex) was a federal electoral district in Ontario, Canada, that was represented in the House of Commons of Canada from 1997 to 2015.

Federal riding
The federal riding was created in 1996 as "Kent—Essex" from Essex—Kent and Kent ridings. Its name was changed to the present name in 1998.

The riding includes the Municipality of Chatham-Kent located south of the Thames River, the former City of Chatham, the Town of Leamington, and the Indian reserve of Moravian 47. The population in 2001 was 106,144 and the area is 1,924 km2.

Members of Parliament

This riding has elected the following member of the Members of Parliament:

Politics
The riding is evenly divided between urban and rural voters, so both manufacturing and agricultural issues sway the results.

Jerry Pickard retired just before the 2006 election campaign, and the federal Conservatives won this riding in the January 23, 2006 election on the back of a promise to help farmers by scrapping the CAIS program. Area farmers believe this promise has not been kept, but the Conservatives held on to the riding in 2008 and 2011.

Federal election results

Chatham-Kent—Essex

				

Note: Conservative vote is compared to the total of the Canadian Alliance vote and Progressive Conservative vote in 2000 election.

Note: Canadian Alliance vote is compared to the Reform vote in 1997 election.

Kent—Essex

See also
 List of Canadian federal electoral districts
 Past Canadian electoral districts

References

Notes

External links
Federal riding history for Kent—Essex from the Library of Parliament
 Federal riding history for Chatham-Kent—Essex from the Library of Parliament
Campaign expense data from Elections Canada
2011 Results from Elections Canada

Former federal electoral districts of Ontario
Chatham-Kent
Leamington, Ontario